Stefan Scholz (born 23 September 1964) is a German rower. He competed in the men's coxless four event at the 1996 Summer Olympics.

References

External links
 

1964 births
Living people
German male rowers
Olympic rowers of Germany
Rowers at the 1996 Summer Olympics
Rowers from Berlin
World Rowing Championships medalists for Germany